James Olds (May 30, 1922 – August 21, 1976) was an American psychologist who co-discovered the pleasure center of the brain with Peter Milner while he was a postdoctoral fellow at McGill University in 1954. He is considered to be one of the founders of modern neuroscience and received numerous distinctions ranging from election to the United States National Academy of Sciences to the Newcomb Cleveland Prize of the American Association for the Advancement of Science.

Biography

Early life and education
Olds was born in Chicago, Illinois, and grew up in Nyack, New York. His father, Leland Olds, later became chairman of the Federal Power Commission under President Franklin D. Roosevelt. His grandfather George D. Olds was the ninth president of Amherst College.

Olds attended college at a number of schools including St. John's College, Annapolis, and the University of Wisconsin but received his undergraduate B.A. from Amherst College in 1947. His undergraduate years were interrupted by military service in the U.S. Army during the Second World War as part of the Persian Gulf Command. Following the war, Olds went on to get his Ph.D. at Harvard University in the Department of Social Relations under Professor Richard L. Solomon. His thesis was focused on motivation and led to his subsequent interest in the biological basis of motivation.

Career
Following his Ph.D., Olds went on to do postdoctoral work at McGill University under Donald Olding Hebb, where he made his most important discovery with Peter Milner. Subsequently, Olds moved to UCLA, where he took his first academic appointment at the Brain Research Institute. In 1957 Olds was appointed associate professor in the Department of Psychology at the University of Michigan. He left Michigan in 1969 to become the Bing Professor of Behavioral Biology at the California Institute of Technology where he continued his research and led a large lab until his death in a swimming accident in August 1976. His last work was aimed at understanding the mechanisms of learning and memory.

Bibliography

 1954 Olds, J., and P. Milner. "Positive reinforcement produced by electrical stimulation of septal area and other regions of rat brain." Journal of Comparative and Physiological Psychology 47:419–27.
 1955 Olds, J. "'Reward' from brain stimulation in the rat." Science 122:878.
The growth and structure of motives; psychological studies in the theory of action The Free  Press (1956)
 1956 Olds, J. "Runway and maze behavior controlled by basomedial forebrain stimulation in the rat." Journal of Comparative and Physiological Psychology, 49:507–12.
 1956 Olds, J., K. F. Killiam, and P. Bach-Y-Rita. "Self-stimulation of the brain used as a screening method for tranquilizing drugs." Science 124:265–66.
 1956 Olds, J. "Pleasure center in the brain." Scientific American 195: 105–16.
 1958 Olds, J. "Self-stimulation of the brain." Science 127:315–24.
 1958 Olds, J., and M. E. Olds. "Positive reinforcement produced by stimulating hypothalamus with iproniazid and other compounds." Science 127:1175–76.
 1965 "Operant conditioning of single unit responses". Proc. 23rd Congr. Physiological Sciences. Excerpta Med. Int. Congr. Ser. no. 87, pp. 372–80.
 1967 "The limbic system and behavioural reinforcement." Progress in Brain Research. 27 144–64.
 "The central nervous system and the reinforcement of behaviour". American Psychologist. 24 (1969) 114–32.
 1969 Olds, J., and Hirano, T.: "Conditioned responses of hippocampal and other neurons." Electroencephalogr. clin. Neurophysiol. 26 159–66.
 1969 Olds, J., and Best, P. J.: "Single unit patterns during anticipatory behaviour". Electroencephalogr. clin. Neurophysiol. 26 144–58.
 1972 Olds, J., Disterhoft, J. F., Segal, M., Kornblith, C. L., and Hirsh, R.: "Learning centres of rat brain mapped by measuring latencies of conditioned unit responses". Journal of Neurophysiology. 35 202–19.
 Drives and reinforcements Raven Books  (1977)

References

1922 births
1976 deaths
History of neuroscience
Harvard University alumni
Amherst College alumni
American neuroscientists
Behavioral neuroscientists
Members of the United States National Academy of Sciences
United States Army soldiers
United States Army personnel of World War II
University of Michigan faculty